Fredy Grossenbacher (born 10 August 1965) is a retired Swiss football defender.

References

1965 births
Living people
Swiss men's footballers
FC Concordia Basel players
FC Basel players
Servette FC players
BSC Young Boys players
Association football defenders
Swiss Super League players
Switzerland under-21 international footballers